The FTSE4Good Index Series is a series of ethical investment stock market indices launched in 2001 by the FTSE Group which reports on the performance of companies which demonstrate "strong Environmental, Social and Governance practices". A number of stock market indices are available, for example covering UK shares, US shares, European markets and Japan, with inclusion based on a range of corporate social responsibility criteria. Research for the indices is supported by the Ethical Investment Research Services (EIRIS). The index excludes companies due to their involvement in tobacco production, nuclear weapons, conventional weapon systems, or coal power industry and rates companies for inclusion based environmental sustainability, relationships with stakeholders, attitudes to human rights, supply chain labour standards and the countering of bribery.

The index series is published by FTSE Russell.

According to an event study reported in 2007, it was uncertain whether inclusion in or exclusion from the index effectively incentivised the affected companies to change their behaviour in regards to social responsibility. Curran and Moran, who undertook the study, found that the movements in share prices which followed FTSE4Good announcements were not significant in a statistical sense. As to the financial performance for investors, there is no evidence that a portfolio that is subject to ethical criteria performs significantly differently compared to their unrestricted equivalent.

See also
 Calvert Social Index
 MSCI KLD 400 Social Index

References

External links
 FTSE4Good Index Series

FTSE Group stock market indices
Ethical investment stock market indices